Zhou Chiheng (1915–1986) was a People's Republic of China politician. He was born in Shaoxing, Zhejiang Province. He was governor of Jilin Province.

1915 births
1986 deaths
People's Republic of China politicians from Zhejiang
Chinese Communist Party politicians from Zhejiang
Governors of Jilin